The 2015–16 MOL Liga was 8th season of the MOL Liga. DVTK Jegesmedvék was the defending champion after defeating HK Nové Zámky in the 2014-2015 season. The league is a multi-national ice hockey league consisting of teams from Hungary and Romania. A new team, Budapest based MAC Budapest joined the league.

Team information

Regular season (Alapszakasz)

Standings

Playoffs

Ice hockey leagues in Hungary
2015–16 in European ice hockey leagues
MOL